Newmarket is a village in the Outer Hebrides of Scotland, on the Isle of Lewis near Stornoway. It is part of the Leodsoch countryside and a peat site is not far away. Its nearest town is Stornoway and the nearest council headquarters is Na h-Eileanan Siar in Stornoway. Newmarket is within the parish of Stornoway. Newmarket is situated on the A857 at the junction with the B895. The remains of a stone circle exist to the west of the villages in a croft.

Peat Site
The peat site is situated just at the border of the village, Laxdaleside.

Neighbouring villages
Neighbouring villages are: Laxdale (Lacasdail), Gress (Griais) and Tong (Thunga).

References

External links

Geograph images of the area around Newmarket

Villages in the Isle of Lewis